The EL/M-2258 ALPHA ("Advanced Lightweight Phased Array") is a multi-function active electronically scanned array naval radar system developed by IAI Elta for maritime installation on medium-sized combat ships such as corvettes, frigates and larger vessels. It is capable of tracking both air and surface targets and providing fire control and splash spotting guidance with target classification. ALPHA is an acronym of Advanced Lightweight Phased Array Naval Radars.

Operators 
The radar is installed in medium-sized combat ships of the Israeli navy.

Sa'ar 4.5-class missile boat
Sa'ar 5-class corvette

Future Operators

Sa'ar 72-class corvette

 Philippine Navy HDC-3100 Future Corvette

References 

Sea radars
Military radars of Israel
Elta products